David B. Agus is an American physician and author who serves as a professor of medicine and engineering at the University of Southern California Keck School of Medicine and Viterbi School of Engineering and the Founding Director and CEO of the Lawrence J. Ellison Institute for Transformative Medicine. He is also the cofounder of several personalized medicine companies and a contributor to CBS News on health topics. He is also the author of four books. 

Agus's field of expertise is advanced cancer. He has developed new cancer treatments with the aid of private foundations, as well as national agencies including the National Cancer Institute. Agus has also served as chair of the Global Agenda Council on Genetics for the World Economic Forum.

Early life and education
Agus graduated cum laude in molecular biology from Princeton University in 1987 and received his medical degree from the University of Pennsylvania Perelman School of Medicine in 1991. He completed his residency training at Johns Hopkins Hospital and completed his oncology fellowship training at Memorial Sloan-Kettering Cancer Center in New York. He spent two years at the National Institutes of Health as a Howard Hughes Medical Institute-NIH Research Scholar.

Career
Agus has had a long and varied career. At the Lawrence J. Ellison Institute for Transformative Medicine, he leads a team researching prevention and treatments for cancer. He also maintains an oncology practice to apply his team's research discoveries to the patients under his care. At the Memorial Sloan-Kettering Cancer Center in New York, he was an attending physician in the Department of Medical Oncology and head of the Laboratory of Tumor Biology. He was also Assistant Professor of Medicine at Cornell University Medical Center.

As director of the Spielberg Family Center for Applied Proteomics at Cedars-Sinai Medical Center in Los Angeles, he led a multidisciplinary team of researchers dedicated to the development and use of proteomic technologies to guide doctors in making health-care decisions tailored to individual needs. The center grew out of earlier clinical projects at Cedars-Sinai, where Agus served as an attending physician in oncology, which observed striking differences between the aggressiveness of prostate cancer in certain patients and their ability to respond to treatment.

Agus also formerly served as Director of the Louis Warschaw Prostate Cancer Center, and as an attending physician in the Department of Medicine, Division of Medical Oncology at Cedars-Sinai Medical Center. He was also an Associate Professor of Medicine at the University of California, Los Angeles (UCLA).

He is presently a Professor of Medicine and Engineering at the Keck School of Medicine of USC and the USC Viterbi School of Engineering and is the CEO and Founding Director of the Lawrence J. Ellison Institute for Transformative Medicine. Agus chairs the Global Agenda Council (GAC) on Genetics for the World Economic Forum, and speaks regularly at TEDMED, the Aspen Ideas Festival and the World Economic Forum.

Agus's research has focused on the use of technology to model cancer and on new treatments for cancer. He has published many scientific articles.

Additional work and affiliations 
He is a member of several scientific and medical societies, including the Council on Foreign Relations, American Association for Cancer Research, American College of Physicians, American Society of Clinical Oncology. Dr. Agus became a contributor for CBS News in 2013 and appears regularly on CBS This Morning and other CBS News platforms.

Agus' first book, The End of Illness, was published in 2012  is a New York Times best seller and international best seller and was the subject of a PBS series. His most recent books A Short Guide to a Long Life and The Lucky Years: How to Thrive in the Brave New World of Health are also New York Times and international bestsellers.

He has founded and co-founded several companies including Oncology.com, Navigenics (a personalized medicine company), Applied Proteomics (together with Danny Hillis), Sensei (wellness and lifestyle company, together with Larry Ellison), Sensei Agriculture (an agriculture data and technology company together with Larry Ellison), and Project Ronin (a clinical intelligence company together with Larry Ellison).

In 2021, Agus and the Ellison Institute launched Global Health Security Consortium, a joint global effort with the Tony Blair Institute for Global Change and Sir John Bell and a team of scientists at the University of Oxford, focused on finding ways to track and treat COVID-19 and prevent future pandemics.

Plagiarism controversy
On March 6, 2023, the Los Angeles Times reported that "at least 95 separate passages" in Agus' book The Book of Animal Secrets: Nature's Lessons for a Long and Happy Life were plagiarized, with the word choice in some instances found to be identical to that in existing sources. The book was initially set to be released the following day by Simon and Schuster, but after the article's publication, it was postponed until the sections in question could be rewritten. Agus issued a public apology. On March 17, 2023, the Los Angeles Times further reported that Agus's first three books; The End of Illness, A Short Guide to a Long Life, and The Lucky Years: How to Thrive in the Brave New World of Health, contained over 120 instances where passages were identical to other texts from sources including books, articles in scientific journals, science blogs, online articles and Wikipedia articles. Almost all of the copied paragraphs or passages did not attribute the original authors. Augus stated he was not aware of, nor had any involvement in the passages that were supposedly plagairised and stated the specific passages were written by his co-writer Kristen Loberg.

Awards 
Agus has received many honors and awards, including the Ellis Island Medal of Honor (2017), American Cancer Society Physician Research Award, a Clinical Scholar Award from the Sloan-Kettering Institute, a CaP CURE Young Investigator Award and the American Society of Clinical Oncology Fellowship Award, the HealthNetwork Foundation's Excellence Award, and the 2009 Geoffrey Beene Foundation's Rock Stars of Science, as seen in GQ. In 2009, he was selected to serve as a judge for the first Biotech Humanitarian Award.

Television show 
Agus hosted a Paramount+ television show titled The Check Up with Dr. David Agus, which was broadcast starting in December 2022. In the show, Agus discussed different medical issues with celebrity guests who have experience with those health concerns.

Personal life
Agus is married to Amy Joyce Povich, actress and daughter of syndicated television talk show host Maury Povich. Her stepmother, Connie Chung, is a former CBS News anchor. His grandfather, Rabbi Jacob B. Agus, was a theologian and the author of several books on Jewish history and philosophy. Agus has two children.

Miscellaneous
Agus appears in the 2006 documentary Who Needs Sleep?

Agus was also the physician to Johnny Ramone during his battle with prostate cancer. He was on the board of directors of the Biden Cancer Initiative, Thrive Global, the National Library of Israel and the Peres Center for Peace and Innovation.

Bibliography 

 2012, The End of Illness. Free Press; Illustrated edition  
 2014, A Short Guide to a Long Life, Simon & Schuster 
 2017, The Lucky Years: How to Thrive in the Brave New World of Health, Simon & Schuster 
 TBA, The Book of Animal Secrets: Nature's Lessons for a Long and Happy Life, Simon & Schuster ISBN 1982103027

References

External links
 Official David Agus site
 CBS News website

Interviews, articles and podcasts
 "David Agus: A new strategy in the war on cancer", TED, Filmed October 2009.
 "The Daily Show with John Stewart, David Agus interview", The Daily Show, interview, 2012.

1965 births
20th-century American Jews
21st-century American Jews
21st-century American male writers
21st-century American non-fiction writers
American male non-fiction writers
American oncologists
American people of Polish-Jewish descent
CBS News people
Jack M. Barrack Hebrew Academy alumni
Jewish American writers
Johns Hopkins University people
Living people
People involved in plagiarism controversies
Perelman School of Medicine at the University of Pennsylvania alumni
Princeton University alumni
University of Southern California faculty